Lysiphragma epixyla is a species of moth in the family Tineidae. It is endemic to New Zealand. It was described by Edward Meyrick in 1888 using specimens collected from Wellington, Lake Wakatipu and Invercargill in December and January. Meyrick notes that this moth can usually be found at rest on tree trunks. This species is endemic to New Zealand.

References

External links

Image of type specimen of Lysiphragma epixyla
Citizen science images of moth

Moths described in 1888
Tineidae
Moths of New Zealand
Endemic fauna of New Zealand
Taxa named by Edward Meyrick
Endemic moths of New Zealand